Mossi Moussa is a Burundian professional footballer, who plays as a midfielder for Le Messager FC in the Burundi Football League.

International career
He was invited by Lofty Naseem, the national team coach, to represent Burundi in the 2014 African Nations Championship held in South Africa.

References

1992 births
Living people
2014 African Nations Championship players
Burundi A' international footballers
Burundian footballers
Association football midfielders